Capital punishment in New Jersey is currently abolished, after Governor of New Jersey Jon Corzine signed a law repealing it in 2007. Before this, capital punishment was used and at least 361 people have been executed.

Early history
It was in effect from 1982 to 2007, though no individuals were executed under the revised provision that covered cases of murder. At least 361 people have been officially executed in New Jersey (including the pre-Revolution Colony of New Jersey) starting with the execution of a slave named Tom for rape in 1690 and ending with the execution of Ralph Hudson for murder on January 22, 1963. The last execution for a crime other than murder was of Andrew Clark in 1872 for rape. The last woman executed was Margaret Meierhoffer in 1881. Except for a dozen slaves executed by burning in the early 18th century, executions in New Jersey were by hanging until 1906 and electrocution since then, with the exception of a single execution by hanging in 1909.

Following the 1963 execution, there were no executions prior to the 1972 ruling in Furman v. Georgia by the Supreme Court of the United States, which led to a de facto ban on executions nationwide until laws meeting the revised standards specified could be enacted. The Supreme Court ruled in 1976 in Gregg v. Georgia that revised statutes were constitutional, though New Jersey did not pass revised legislation until 1982 which included anyone who "purposely or knowingly causes death" or someone who "contracts for the murder". Under the 1982 statute, there were 228 capital trials. Of the 60 cases in which juries returned a verdict for capital punishment, 57 were overturned and eight inmates remained on death row (in some cases an overturned death sentence results in a sentencing retrial, and another death sentence).

A series of bills was introduced in the Assembly in 1992 to make it harder for New Jersey courts to overturn death sentence convictions, including legislation that would prevent the introduction of evidence regarding the method used for capital punishment during trials, as part of an effort to close off "another avenue for overturning death-penalty sentences". In May 1996, Assembly member Gary Stuhltrager criticized efforts to delay the imposition of the death penalty, saying "If you're going to have it, do it".

2007 repeal
In December 2005, the New Jersey Senate passed a one-year moratorium on executions by the state, with a commission to determine that the system is efficient and equitable. The measure was passed by the legislature on January 10, 2006. Governor of New Jersey Richard Codey signed the measure into law on January 12. New Jersey became the first state to pass such a moratorium legislatively, rather than by executive order. Although New Jersey reinstated the death penalty in 1982, the state has not executed anyone since 1963. The abolition vote was recommended by a report from the New Jersey Death Penalty Study Commission.

On December 17, 2007, following the passage of an abolition bill that passed in the General Assembly by a 44–36 margin, Governor Jon Corzine signed the bill, making New Jersey the 14th state without a death penalty and the first state to abolish it by legislative action rather than by judicial decision since Gregg v. Georgia.

All eight inmates on death row had their sentences subsequently commuted to life in prison without parole by Governor Corzine. The list included Jesse Timmendequas, whose rape and murder of his 7-year-old neighbor, Megan Kanka, led to the creation of Megan's Law. Other inmates who had been on New Jersey's death row at the time of abolition were John Martini, who kidnapped and killed a Bergen County businessman, and Brian Wakefield, who beat and stabbed an Atlantic City couple and set their bodies on fire.

See also
 List of people executed in New Jersey
 Crime in New Jersey
 Law of New Jersey

References

 
New Jersey
New Jersey law